Miguel Ángel Bazze (born 30 April 1955) is an Argentine politician, currently serving as National Deputy elected in Buenos Aires Province since 2011. A member of the Radical Civic Union, Bazze he sits in the Juntos por el Cambio inter-bloc in the Chamber of Deputies.

Bazze previously served as a member of the Buenos Aires Province Chamber of Deputies, as a city councillor in La Plata, and as president of the Buenos Aires Province Committee of the Radical Civic Union.

Early life and career
Bazze was born on 30 April 1955 in General Roca, in Río Negro Province. When he was 17 years old, he moved to La Plata to study engineering at the National University of La Plata, and it was there he began his political activism in the student wing of the Radical Civic Union, Franja Morada. He would later drop out of university to dedicate himself to politics full time.

Bazze is married and has five sons.

Political career
From 1985 to 1989, Bazze was a member of the La Plata City Council. Then, from 1989 to 1993, he was a member of the Buenos Aires Province Chamber of Deputies elected in the Capital Electoral Section (corresponding to the La Plata Partido). In 2010, he was elected president of the Provincial Committee of the Radical Civic Union, a position he held until 2012 when he was succeeded by Alejandro Armendáriz.

In 2011, Bazze ran for a seat in the Argentine Chamber of Deputies as the first candidate in the Union for Social Development (UDESO) list; the list received 11.54% of the vote and Bazze was elected. He was re-elected in 2015 and in 2019, both times as the third candidate in the Cambiemos and Juntos por el Cambio lists.

Electoral history

References

External links

Profile on the official website of the Chamber of Deputies (in Spanish)

Living people
1955 births
Members of the Argentine Chamber of Deputies elected in Buenos Aires Province
Members of the Buenos Aires Province Chamber of Deputies
People from General Roca
People from La Plata
National University of La Plata alumni
20th-century Argentine politicians
21st-century Argentine politicians